Ted Adams may refer to:
 Ted Adams (actor) (1890–1973), American film actor
 Ted Adams (footballer) (1906–1991), English professional footballer who played as a goalkeeper
 Ted Adams (cricketer) (1896–1977), Australian cricketer
 Ted Adams (publisher), American comic publisher

See also
 Edward Adams (disambiguation)
 Theodore Samuel Adams (1885–1961), British colonial civil servant